Frank Di Giorgio is a Canadian former politician. He sat on Toronto City Council and represented Ward 12 York South—Weston from 2000 to 2018. Prior to the amalgamation of Toronto, Di Giorgio was a member of the North York City Council from 1985 to 1997, representing Ward 4.

Background
With a mathematics degree from McMaster University, he was a high school math teacher before entering politics.

Political career

North York Council 
Di Giorgio was elected as Ward 4 Councillor to North York's council in the 1985 Toronto election defeating Barb Shiner. He was a close ally of Mayor Mel Lastman.

During his time as a North York Councillor, Di Giorgio served as a member of the Executive Committee and chaired all major standing committees, including Works, Transportation, Planning Advisory, Library Board, Parks and Recreation and Capital Planning. His contribution as founding director of the Ford Performing Arts Centre and his help in creating the Capital Planning Committee brought both a knowledgeable voice and prudent change to North York.

Toronto City Council 
In his role as Toronto city councillor Di Giorgio was appointed budget chief under Mayor Rob Ford in 2013.

During the mayoralty of John Tory he also held important Council committee positions. He was a member of the Executive Committee and sat on the Board of Directors for Toronto Community Housing Corporation (TCHC) as the Mayor's designate.

Di Giorgio ran for re-election as councillor in the newly formed Ward 5 York South—Weston in the 2018 Toronto election and lost to Frances Nunziata.

Electoral record

Unofficial results as of October 26, 2010 03:55 am

References

McMaster University alumni
Toronto city councillors
Living people
Year of birth missing (living people)